The USCGC Tiger (WSC-152) was an Active-class patrol boat of the United States Coast Guard. The vessel guarded the entrance to Pearl Harbor all day and night on December 7, during the Attack on Pearl Harbor during World War II.

Design and construction 
USCGC Tiger (WSC-152) was the 28th of 35 ships in the Active class patrol boat, designed to serve as a "mother ship" in support of Prohibition against bootleggers and smugglers along the coasts. They were meant to be able to stay at sea for long periods of time in any kinds of weather, and were able to expand berthing space via hammocks of the need arises, such as if a large amount of survivors were on board. Built by the American Brown Boveri Electric Corporation of Camden, New Jersey, she was laid down on 1 February 1927. The cutter was launched on 18 April 1927, transferred to the Coast Guard on 29 April 1927 and commissioned on 3 May 1927. Like the rest of her class, she was 125 feet (38 m) long, had a 22-foot-6-inch (6.86 m) beam and a 7-foot-6-inch (2.29 m) draft. A single 3-inch (76 mm) gun was mounted as the offensive weapon as launch. She was numbered as hull #346 before being given a name, and launched from slipway J with five other sister ships.

Service history 
Tiger was placed in commission at 11:25 AM on 3 May 1927. The vessel operated out of Coast Guard Base Two in Stapleton, New York, until shifting to Norfolk, Virginia, arriving there on 6 June 1933. Subsequently, the  cutter was transferred to the Territory of Hawaii and operated out of Honolulu. In mid-1941, she came under jurisdiction of the United States Navy and was assigned to the local defense force of the 14th Naval District. Equipped with depth charges and listening gear, Tiger then operated out of Honolulu in company with her sister ship  and the   into late 1941. On December 7, the Imperial Japanese Navy launched a surprise attack on the Pacific Fleet at its Pearl Harbor base.

Tiger, patrolling off Barber's Point that morning, won her first Battle Star for participation during the attack.

Fate 
She was decommissioned on 12 November 1947. On 14 June 1948 the cutter was sold as Polar Merchant #257391, before being completely stripped and used as a floating hull in Tacoma, Washington in 2018.

References

1927 ships
Active-class patrol boats
Ships of the United States Coast Guard
Ships built in Camden, New Jersey
Brown, Boveri & Cie